Franck Nunke (born 6 February 1997) is a Cameroonian professional footballer.

References

External links 
 
 

1997 births
Living people
Cameroonian footballers
Cameroonian expatriate footballers
Expatriate footballers in Belarus
Association football midfielders
Tonnerre Yaoundé players
FC Dynamo Brest players